This is a list of selected American print journalists, including some of the more notable figures of 20th-century newspaper and magazine journalism.

19th-century print journalists
M. E. C. Bates (1839–1905) – writer, journalist, newspaper editor; co-organizer/president of the Michigan Woman's Press Association; associate editor of the Grand Traverse Herald; writer for the Evening Record and the Detroit Tribune; oldest, continuous, newspaper correspondent in Michigan
Mary Temple Bayard (pen name, "Meg"; 1853-1916), writer, journalist
Philip Alexander Bell (1808–1886) – abolitionist; founder and editor of The Colored American, The Pacific Appeal, and The San Francisco Elevator
Lettie S. Bigelow (1849–1906) – "Aunt Dorothy" letters at True Light
Anna Braden (1858-1939) – editor, Presbyterian Visitor
Mary Towne Burt (1842–1898) – newspaper publisher and editor of Our Union, the organ of the Woman's Christian Temperance Union
Emma Shaw Colcleugh (1846–1940) – newspaper book reviewer (The Providence Journal) and contributor (Boston Evening Transcript)
Susan E. Dickinson (1842–1915) – Civil War correspondent, noted for her articles about the coal mining industry, suffrage, and women's rights
Barbara Galpin (1855–1922) – journalist; affiliated for 25 years with the Somerville Journal, serving as compositor, proof reader, cashier, editor woman's page and assistant manager
William Lloyd Garrison (1805–1809) – editor of the abolitionist newspaper The Liberator
Horace Greeley (1811–1872) – newspaper editor, founder of the New York Tribune, reformer, politician, opponent of slavery
Eliza Trask Hill (1840–1908) – activist, journalist, philanthropist; founder, editor, Woman's Voice and Public School Champion, an organ of the Protestant Independent Women Voters 
Florence Huntley (1855-1912) – journalist and editor, St. Paul Pioneer Press,  Minneapolis Tribune, The Washington Post
Thomas Nast (1840–1902) – German-born American caricaturist and editorial cartoonist' the scourge of Boss Tweed and the Tammany Hall machine' considered to be the "father of the American cartoon"
John Neal (1793–1876) – fiction author; critic; magazine and newspaper essayist and editor; founder of The Yankee; America's first daily newspaper columnist
Alice Hobbins Porter (1854–1926) – British-born American journalist, correspondent, editor
Esther Pugh (1834-1908) – editor and publisher of Our Union, the organ of the Woman's Christian Temperance Union
Anna Rankin Riggs (1835-1908) – founder, editor, Oregon White Ribbon, official organ of the Oregon WCTU
Anne Royall (1769–1854) – first female journalist in the United States; first woman to interview a president; publisher and editor for Paul Pry (1831–1836) and The Huntress (1836–54) in Washington, D.C.
Rowena Granice Steele (1824–1901) – performer, author, newspaper journalist, editor, publisher; contributor to The Golden Era, co-founder of The Pioneer , assistant editor of the San Joaquin Valley Argus, editor and proprietor of the Budget
Susie Forrest Swift (1862–1916) – editor of All the World, Catholic World, and Young Catholic
Henry James Ten Eyck (1856–1887) – editor of Albany Evening Journal.
Lydia H. Tilton (1839–1915) – newspaper correspondent
Rosa Kershaw Walker (1840s–1909) – society section journalist of St. Louis Post-Dispatch and St. Louis Globe-Democrat; proprietor and editor of Fashion and Fancy
Jeannette H. Walworth (pen names, "Mother Goose" and "Ann Atom"; 1835–1918) – American journalist, novelist; contributor to The Continent and The Commercial Appeal
Ida B. Wells (1862–1931) – investigative journalist and reformer, noted for investigating lynching in the United States
Rosa Louise Woodberry (1869–1932) – journalist, educator; on staff with The Augusta Chronicle and the Savannah Press
Caroline M. Clark Woodward (1840-1924), temperance newspaper writer

19th-century and 20th-century print journalists
Arthur William à Beckett (1844–1909) – English journalist and intellectual
Ambrose Bierce (1842–1914?) – editor, columnist, and journalist
Marion Howard Brazier (1850–1935) – journalist, editor, author, and clubwoman; society editor of The Boston Post (1890–98) and The Boston Journal (1903-11); edited and published the Patriotic Review (1898-1900)
Adda Burch (1869-1929) – Pennsylvania State reporter to The Union Signal
Mamie Claflin (1867-1929) – publisher, St. Paul Phonograph; editor, Ord Journal; editor and publisher, The Union Worker
Richard Harding Davis (1864–1916) – first American correspondent to cover the Spanish–American War (1898), Second Boer War (1899–1902), Russo-Japanese War (1904–05) and the 1914–16 stages of World War I
Mary G. Charlton Edholm (1854–1935) – reformer, journalist; World's Superintendent of press work, Woman's Christian Temperance Union; secretary for the International Federation Women's Press League; contributor,  New York World, the Chicago Tribune, St. Louis Post-Dispatch, Republican, Chicago Inter Ocean, The Union Signal, the New York Voice, Woman's Journal, The Woman's Tribune, and the California Illustrated Magazine; editor, The Christian Home
Jessie Forsyth (1847/49 – 1937) – temperance advocate; editor of The Temperance Brotherhood, The Massachusetts Templar, International Good Templar, and The Dawn
Ella M. George (1850–1938) – contributor, Christian Statesman; editor, Pennsylvania W.C.T.U. Bulletin 
Jeannette Leonard Gilder (pen name, "Brunswick"; 1849–1916) – author, journalist, critic, editor; regular correspondent and literary critic, Chicago Tribune; correspondent, Boston Saturday Evening Gazette, Boston Transcript, Philadelphia Record and Press; owner and editor, The Reader: An Illustrated Monthly Magazine; Newark reporter, New York Tribune; editorial department, Morning Register; literary editor, Scribner's Monthly; drama and music critic, New York Herald; co-founder, The Critic
Eva Kinney Griffith (1852–1918) – journalist, temperance activist, novelist, newspaper editor, journal publisher; contributor, Temperance Banner, The Union Signal, and Woman's News; publisher, True Ideal; special writer, Daily News Record; society editor, Chicago Times
Kate E. Griswold (1860-1923), editor, publisher, and proprietor of Profitable Advertising
Corinne Stocker Horton (1871–1947) – newspaper editor (The Atlanta Journal); journalist
Maria I. Johnston (1835-1921) - reporter, correspondent, writer and/or editor at the St. Louis Globe-Democrat, St. Louis Spectator, New Orleans Picayune, New Orleans Times-Democrat, and Boston Woman's Journal
Lillian A. Lewis (1861–?) – first African-American woman journalist in Boston
Martha D. Lincoln (1838–?; pen name, "Bessie Beech"), American author and journalist; co-founder, Woman's National Press Association
Estelle M. H. Merrill (pen name, "Jean Kincaid"; 1858–1908) – journalist, editor; charter member of the New England Woman's Press Association, contributor to the Boston Transcript, staff on The Boston Globe, co-editor of American Motherhood, 
S. Isadore Miner (1863–1916; pen name, "Pauline Periwinkle") – journalist, poet, teacher, feminist; first corresponding secretary of the Michigan Woman's Press Association; staff member of Good Health; founder, editor of the "Woman's Century" page of The Dallas Morning News
Robert Percival Porter (1852–1917), British-born American journalist, editor, statistician; co-founder of the New York Press
Effie Hoffman Rogers (1853/55 - 1918), editor-in-chief and publisher of the P.E.O. Record
Grace Carew Sheldon (1855–1921) – journalist, author, editor, businesswoman; staff and special correspondent of the Buffalo Courier; department editor of the Buffalo Times
Jennie O. Starkey (ca. 1856 – 1918) — journalist and editor, Detroit Free Press; charter member, Michigan Woman's Press Association; president, Michigan Woman's Press Club; board of directors, Michigan Authors' Association
Jane Agnes Stewart (1860-1944) — author, newspaper editor
Sallie Joy White (1847–1909) – journalist
Alice Willard (1860–1936) – journalist, editor
Ella B. Ensor Wilson (1838–1913) – founder, proprietor, editor of the Wilsonton Journal

20th-century print journalists
Al Abrams (1904–1977) – sportswriter, columnist and editor for the Pittsburgh Post-Gazette
Jack Anderson (1922–2005) – syndicated political columnist
Paul Y. Anderson (1893–1938) – investigative journalist, winner of Pulitzer Prize 1929
Hannah Arendt (1906–1975) – known for book on Eichmann trial
Russell Baker (1925–2019) – newspaper and magazine essayist
Jeanne Bellamy (1911–2004) – reporter and first female member of the editorial board for the Miami Herald
Robert Benchley (1889–1945) – newspaper and magazine humorist 
Marilyn Berger (born 1935) – diplomatic correspondent, Washington Post
Carl Bernstein (born 1944) – investigative journalist, Washington Post
Les Biederman (1907–1981) – sportswriter, columnist and editor for Pittsburgh Press
Edna Lee Booker – foreign correspondent in China during the 1930s and 1940s
Croswell Bowen (1905–1971) – reporter for PM Magazine and The New Yorker during the 1940s and 1950s
Ben Bradlee (1921–2014) – editor of the Washington Post at the time of the Watergate scandal
Jimmy Breslin (1930–2017) – New York columnist
Eve Brodlique (1867–1949) – Chicago columnist, editor
Heywood Broun (1888–1939) – columnist and guild organizer
Helen Gurley Brown (1922–2012) – editor of Cosmopolitan magazine
Art Buchwald (1925–2007) – syndicated columnist and humorist
William F. Buckley, Jr. (1925–2008) – founder and editor of The National Review
Herb Caen (1916–1997) – San Francisco columnist
C. P. Connolly (1863–1935) – radical investigative journalist associated for many years with Collier's Weekly
Harriet L. Cramer (1847–1922) – newspaper editor and publisher, The Evening Wisconsin
Linda Deutsch (born 1943) – American Associated Press court journalist
Roger Ebert (1942–2013) – Pulitzer Prize-winning Chicago film critic
Margaret Dye Ellis (1845-1925) — correspondent, The Union Signal
Mary Fels (1863–1953) – editor of The Public: A Journal of Democracy
Jack Fuller (1946–2016) – editor and publisher of the Chicago Tribune
Martha Gellhorn (1908–1998) – war correspondent
Bob Greene (born 1947) – journalist
Frances Nimmo Greene (1867-1937) — editor, woman's page of The Birmingham News
Ruth Gruber (1911–2016) – journalist
Emily Hahn (1905–1997) – wrote extensively on China
David Halberstam (1934–2007) – foreign correspondent, political and sport journalist
Arnold Hano (1922–2021) – freelance journalist, book editor, biographer and novelist
Seymour Hersh (born 1937) – investigative journalist and political writer
Hugh Hefner (1926–2017) – founder and editor of Playboy
Hedda Hopper (1885–1966) – syndicated gossip columnist
Molly Ivins (1944–2007) – Texas-based syndicated columnist
Dorothy Misener Jurney (1909–2002) – influential journalist covering women's issues on women's pages
Pauline Kael (1919–2001) – film critic for The New Yorker
K. Connie Kang (1942–2019) – first female Korean American journalist, wrote for Los Angeles Times
James J. Kilpatrick (1920–2010) – syndicated political columnist
Irv Kupcinet (1912–2003) – syndicated columnist for the Chicago Sun-Times
Ring Lardner (1885–1933) – sportswriter and short-story writer
Frances Lewine (1921–2008) – Associated Press White House correspondent; president of the Women's National Press Club
A. J. Liebling (1904–1963) – journalist closely associated with The New Yorker
Walter Lippmann (1889–1974) – Washington, D.C. political columnist
Della Campbell MacLeod (ca. 1884 – ?) — author, journlalist
Eva Anne Madden (1863–1958) – educator, journalist, playwright, author
Ray Marcano – medical reporter and music critic
Ralph G. Martin (1920–2013) – combat correspondent for Armed Forces newspaper Stars and Stripes and Army weekly magazine Yank; wrote for Newsweek and The New Republic
George McElroy (1922–2006) – first black reporter for the Houston Post and first minority columnist of any newspaper in Houston
H. L. Mencken (1880–1956) – essayist, critic, and editor of The Baltimore Sun
Ruth Montgomery (1912–2001) – first female reporter in the Washington bureau of the New York Daily News; president of the Women's National Press Club
Jim Murray (1919–1998) – Los Angeles sports columnist
Eldora Marie Bolyard Nuzum (1926–2004) – first female editor of a daily newspaper in West Virginia, journalist, interviewer of U.S. presidents
Robert Palmer (1945–1997) – first full-time chief pop music critic for The New York Times, Rolling Stone contributing editor
Louella Parsons (1881–1972) – syndicated gossip columnist
Drew Pearson (1897–1969) – Washington political columnist
George Plimpton (1927–2003) – magazine journalist and editor of Paris Review
Shirley Povich (1905–1998) – sportswriter for The Washington Post
Ernie Pyle (1900–1945) – Pulitzer Prize-winning war correspondent
Patricia Raybon – published in The New York Times Magazine, Newsweek, USA Today and Chicago Tribune
James ("Scotty") Reston (1909–1995) – political commentator for the New York Times
Grantland Rice (1880–1954) – sportswriter
Mike Royko (1932–1997) – Pulitzer Prize-winning Chicago columnist
Damon Runyon (1880–1941) – newspaper journalist and essayist
Harrison Salisbury (1908–1993) – first regular New York Times correspondent in Moscow after World War II
E. W. Scripps (1854–1926) – founder of the Scripps-Howard newspaper chain
George Seldes (1890–1995) – journalist, editor and publisher of In Fact
Randy Shilts (1951–1994) – reporter for The Advocate and San Francisco Chronicle
Hugh Sidey (1927–2005) – political writer for Life and Time magazines
Roger Simon (1948–) – journalist and author
Agnes Smedley (1892–1950) – journalist and writer known for her chronicling of the Chinese revolution
Drue Smith (died 2001) – print and broadcast journalist
Red Smith (1905–1982) – New York sports columnist
Edgar Snow (1905–1972) – journalist and writer, chronicled the Chinese revolution, especially in Red Star Over China
I.F. Stone (1907–1989) – investigative journalist, publisher of I.F. Stone's Weekly
Anna Louise Strong (1885–1970) – pro-communist journalist and writer
Helen Thomas (1920–2013) – White House correspondent for United Press International
Dorothy Thompson (1893–1961) – journalist and radio broadcaster. In 1939 she was recognized by Time magazine as the second most influential woman in America after Eleanor Roosevelt. Regarded as the "First Lady of American Journalism."
Hunter S. Thompson (1937–2005) – creator of Gonzo journalism
Theodore White (1915–1986) – reporter for Time magazine in China, 1939–1944, author of Making of the President
Anne Elizabeth Wilson (1901–1946) – editorial positions at Canadian Homes & Gardens, Mayfair, Chatelaine, Hodder & Stoughton Ltd., Musson Book Company, Maclean's
Earl Wilson (1907–1987) – syndicated gossip columnist
Walter Winchell (1897–1972) – columnist and radio broadcaster
Charles A. Windle (1866–1934) – anti-prohibitionist, editor of Iconoclast
Bob Woodward (born 1943) – investigative journalist, Washington Post
Alexander Woollcott (1887–1943) – New York drama critic

21st-century print journalists
Cecilia Ballí (born 1974), covers Mexican border
Santo Biasatti
Katya Cengel
Nelson Castro
Ron Chernow
Charles Duhigg
Lloyd Grove — gossip columnist for the New York Daily News
Maria Hall-Brown
David Harsanyi — editor, National Review
Oliver Holt
Gwen Ifill
Mike Jones
Mary Jordan (journalist)
Jens Erik Gould
Nicholas Kristof
Jorge Lanata
John Leland
Joshua Lyon
Steve Mirsky — columnist for Scientific American
María Laura Santillán
Eric Schlosser
Paul Spencer Sochaczewski — writer, writing coach, conservationist and communications advisor to international non-governmental organizations
Jackie Summers — food writer
Kaitlyn Vincie
David Warsh — Gerald Loeb Award-winning journalist, published in both print and non-print media
Amy Westervelt (born 1978)
Tom Wilber
Brian Williams
Paige Williams (author)

See also
 History of American newspapers
 History of journalism
 American Journalism Historians Association
 Illinois Woman%27s Press Association 
 National Federation of Press Women
 Media bias in the United States
 Irish American journalism

Further reading

 Applegate, Edd. Advocacy journalists: A biographical dictionary of writers and editors (Scarecrow Press, 2009).
 Ashley, Perry J. American newspaper journalists: 1690-1872 (Gale, 1985; Dictionary of literary biography, vol. 43)
 Mckerns, Joseph. Biographical Dictionary of American Journalism (1989)
 Paneth,  Donald. Encyclopedia of American Journalism (1983)
 Vaughn,  Stephen L., ed. Encyclopedia of American Journalism (2007)

References

Print Journalists
 Print
American print